William H. Huntington (1848–1916) was a member of the Wisconsin State Assembly.

Biography
Huntington was born on May 8, 1848 in Malone, New York. Later, he became heavily involved in the newspaper industry.

Political career
Huntington was a member of the Assembly in 1883. He had previously been an unsuccessful candidate for the Assembly in 1880. Additionally, Huntington was village clerk of Durand, Wisconsin, now a city, and a justice of the peace. He was a Republican.

References

1848 births
1916 deaths
People from Malone, New York
People from Durand, Wisconsin
Republican Party members of the Wisconsin State Assembly
American justices of the peace
19th-century American newspaper publishers (people)
American printers
19th-century printers
Editors of Wisconsin newspapers
19th-century American newspaper editors
19th-century American judges